The Summer Exhibition is an open art exhibition held annually by the Royal Academy in Burlington House, Piccadilly in central London, England, during the months of June, July, and August. The exhibition includes paintings, prints, drawings, sculpture, architectural designs and models, and is the largest and most popular open exhibition in the United Kingdom. It is also "the longest continuously staged exhibition of contemporary art in the world".

When the Royal Academy was founded in 1768 one of its key objectives was to establish an annual exhibition, open to all artists of merit, which could be visited by the public. The first Summer Exhibition took place in 1769; it has been held every year since without exception.

History

In 1768, a group of artists visited King George III and sought his permission to establish a society for Arts and Design. They proposed the idea of an annual exhibition and a school design. King George III approved of the idea and the first exhibition, in 1769, included 136 works. The name Summer Exhibition dates from 1870.

Selection process
Today, around 1,000 works are selected each year from as many as 10,000 entries representing some 5,000 artists. Any artist (living, known or unknown) may submit up to two works at a fee of £35 per piece for selection by The Summer Exhibition Selection and Hanging Committee. Due to the significant increase in the volume of entries over recent years, the number of entries per artist was reduced to 2 (from 3) and the fee was increased £18 per piece. The committee is formed from the Council of Academicians (the governing body of the RA) and is traditionally chaired by the President of the Royal Academy.  In addition to those works selected by the committee, all 80 Academicians are entitled to have six of their own pieces in the exhibition.

For the 2006 exhibition, the academy received a statue and a plinth from David Hensel. By mistake, the two parts were judged independently, with the result that the statue was rejected and the plinth put on display.

Exhibition

The RA Summer Exhibition usually opens to the public in early June, preceded by a series of private viewings. The main event is called "Varnishing Day", the day that, according to popular legend, artists would come to add a final coat of varnish to their paintings (compare: vernissage). Traditionally, artists walk in procession from Burlington House to St James's Church, Piccadilly, where a service is held. At the opening reception the shortlists for various prizes are announced.

Some years have particular themes. The 2005 exhibition theme was "Printmaking and the multiple". In 2006, the theme was "From Life." In 2008, the theme was "Man Made". The theme for 2010 was "Raw". In 2011, the selection committee agreed to have no specific theme. 

Almost all exhibited works are for sale; the Academy receives 30% of the purchase price. In 2003, this amounted to a sum of some £2,000,000 for the institution, which receives no financial support from the state or crown.

Curators
2005: Stephen Farthing and Christopher Orr
2012: Tess Jaray
2013: Eva Jiřičná and Norman Ackroyd
2015: Michael Craig-Martin
2016: Yinka Shonibare
2017: Eileen Cooper
2018: Grayson Perry
2019 Jock McFadyen

Awards
Over £70,000 prize money, including the £25,000 Charles Wollaston Award, is awarded each year at the Summer Exhibition. In addition, a £10,000 architectural prize is awarded.

Winners of Charles Wollaston Award
1997: R.B. Kitaj
1999: David Hockney
2000: Gerard Hemsworth
2001: Marc Quinn
2003: Jake and Dinos Chapman 
2006: Chantal Joffe
2007: Gavin Turk
2008: Jeff Koons
2009: Richard Wilson
2010: Yinka Shonibare
2011: Alison Wilding
2012: Anselm Kiefer
2013: El Anatsui
2014: Wolfgang Tillmans

Reception

The exhibition has received both admiration and criticism. Jonathan Jones described it in 2019 as the "bloated corpse of a tradition ... [with] a tired, inward looking, end-of-the-road quality".

An exhibition about the history of the Summer Exhibition, The Great Spectacle, was held in 2018.

References

Further reading
 (see index)
 The Great Spectacle: 250 Years of the Royal Academy Summer Exhibition (2018), by Mark Hallett and Sarah Victoria Turner
 Posters: A Century of Summer Exhibitions at the Royal Academy (2015), by Mark Pomeroy

External links
 Summer Exhibition website
 The Royal Academy Summer Exhibition: A Chronicle, 1769–2018
 About the Researching the Summer Exhibition project (Paul Mellon Centre)
 RESEARCHING THE SUMMER EXHIBITION (The Royal Academy)
 RA Summer Exhibition: The promotional power of the poster (BBC)
  (Search facility by artist)

Recurring events established in 1769
Art exhibitions in London
Royal Academy
June events
July events
August events
1769 in art